Tomteboda is a place in northern Stockholm, Sweden, known for its mail terminal and its shunting yard. A new railway tunnel for commuters has been built between Stockholm South Station and Tomteboda.

See also 

 Stockholm commuter rail
 Swedish Railway Museum

External links 
 Tomteboda hösten 2001 and 2003 information from the Swedish National Heritage Board (in Swedish)
  (1968)

Geography of Stockholm
Transport in Stockholm